Sunday Bloody Sunday is a 1971 British drama film directed by John Schlesinger, written by Penelope Gilliatt, and starring Glenda Jackson, Peter Finch, Murray Head and Dame Peggy Ashcroft. It tells the story of a free-spirited young bisexual artist (played by Head) and his simultaneous relationships with a divorced recruitment consultant (Jackson) and a gay Jewish doctor (Finch).

Although a box office failure in many regions of the United States, the film received critical acclaim upon release, with major praise drawn towards Schlesinger's direction, performances of the cast (particularly of Finch and Jackson), and its screenplay. The film garnered significant praise for its positive depiction of homosexuality, marking a considerable departure from Schlesinger's previous film Midnight Cowboy (1969), which portrayed gay men as alienated and self-loathing beings, as well as other gay-themed films of the era, including The Boys in the Band (1970) and Some of My Best Friends Are... (1971).

The film received numerous accolades. At the 25th British Academy Film Awards, the film received eight nominations, winning a leading five awards, including for the Best Film. It received four nominations at the 44th Academy Awards; Best Director, Best Actor (for Finch), Best Actress (for Jackson), and Best Original Screenplay.

Plot
Set in London, the film tells the story of a middle-aged gay Jewish doctor, Daniel Hirsh (Peter Finch), and a divorced woman in her mid-30s, Alex Greville (Glenda Jackson), who are both involved in an open love triangle with sculptor Bob Elkin (Murray Head), a younger man in his mid-20s. Not only are Daniel and Alex each aware that Bob is seeing the other but they know one another through common friends. Despite this, they are willing to put up with the situation through fear of losing Bob, who switches freely between them. Bob has his own coterie of artist friends who support his work, which consists of glass fountains.

Alex and Daniel are both close friends with the Hodsons, who are a bohemian, academic middle-class family living somewhere in a leafy London suburb. They alternate having Sunday dinner with the Hodsons, who are quite aware of their relationships but do not talk about them, though the Hodson children are inclined to snicker. Alex also has a depressed client who has recently lost his job to age discrimination. They sleep together at Alex's flat, and then Bob announces his arrival, forcing them to pretend to be having a casual drink. Bob tells Alex that he has no problem with her sleeping with other men. They are, in his words, "free".

There are minor crises in the narrative. The Hodsons' family dog is run over by a truck which narrowly misses eldest daughter Lucy. Daniel has to deal with a former lover (Jon Finch) who is a heroin addict. After unsuccessfully trying to fill a heroin prescription for him at a pharmacy, being unable to prove he is a doctor, Daniel finds that his medical bag has been stolen from his car.

For Alex, the relationship is bound up with growing disillusion about her professional life, failed marriage and uneasy childhood. For Daniel, it represents an escape from the repressed nature of his Jewish upbringing. Both realise the lack of permanence about the situation. When Bob decides to leave the country to settle in New York, after receiving an offer to open his own art gallery, they both come face to face for the first time in the narrative. Despite their opposed circumstances, Daniel and Alex come to realise that it is time to move on; Bob leaves for the United States.

The film ends with an unconventional speech from Daniel directly to the audience. He muses on his relationship with Bob, his friends' concern for his happiness, and declares "I am happy, apart from missing him." His last remark is "I only came about my cough," often a punch-line to a joke about a man going to the doctor and getting unexpected news.

Cast

Production notes
Schlesinger had the idea for the film when making Far from the Madding Crowd. The film took five years of development. "There were endless delays," said the director. "No one was very keen about our doing the film." There were casting problems. "For what it is it ended up being terribly expensive."

Script 
The film was partly based on Schlesinger's personal experience as a Jewish English gay man. He approached Penelope Gilliatt, who had recently finished a novel, A Statement of Change, about a love triangle involving a doctor, and asked if she would write a script. They collaborated extensively on the first draft.

The relationship between Schlesinger and Gilliatt was somewhat difficult. According to John Schlesinger biographer William J. Mann, the first draft came out of intensive collaboration and brainstorming sessions between Schlesinger and Gillattt. Schlesinger and producer Joseph Janni did not like Gilliatt's dialogues. By that time, Gilliatt already moved to New York to work for The New Yorker magazine, and did not want to return to London to revise the script. David Sherwin was brought in to do an extensive rewrite. Sherwin and Schlesinger are not credited for the script, because Gilliatt had it in her contract that she would be the sole scriptwriter.

After the film's success in the United Kingdom, Gilliatt took the sole credit in the published final script in her interviews, going as far as stating that the "ideas had been hers", while in fact the initial idea was Schlesinger's and the story was very personal to him. Producer Joseph Janni wrote her a letter, asking her to acknowledge the collaborative nature of the final script, statingI have just received a copy of the book of SUNDAY BLOODY SUNDAY and I am flabergasted at the note at the back which says that you "first thought of this film script on a train in Switzerland".

I am writing this letter to you because of what has happened for some time with regard to verbal and written statements, ... all made by you with regard to the authorship.... You have gone out of your way to want to create in everybody's mind the impression that the subject and the subsequent script were entirely your creation....

I want to be very clear that we do not want to take away from you any glory or fail to recognise the marvellous work you have done on the script of SUNDAY BLOODY SUNDAY. I wish, however, that any statement made about this work should correspond to the truth as I have stated it above and the reason for my writing this letter is to ask you to do so, so that we should not be forced, especially when coming to America for the opening of the film, to have to deny certain statements or make declarations which will conflict with yours and which ultimately will not be pleasant for any of us.

Casting
The original choice for Alex was Vanessa Redgrave.

John Schlesinger said he wanted Peter Finch for the role of Daniel Hirsh. However, he was meant to star in a film of Man's Fate so was unavailable. He then cast Alan Bates but Bates was held up filming The Go-Between (1970), so Ian Bannen was cast. Apparently, Bannen was so nervous about what kissing another male actor on screen might do to his career, he could not concentrate enough to even get going with the part. He later said that losing the role set back his career, and regretted it till his death. He was replaced by Finch who had by then become available.

Schlesinger was thinking of casting Jean Simmons until he saw Glenda Jackson in Women in Love and decided to offer her the role.

Several actresses (including Dame Edith Evans and Thora Hird) politely refused the part of Glenda Jackson's mother, Mrs. Greville, because they thought the project was too risqué. Dame Peggy Ashcroft accepted, after the director explained to her the elements of the story, and she gladly signed on.

Filming
Filming took place from March to August 1970.

Daniel Day-Lewis made his film debut in an uncredited role as a vandal. He described the experience as "heaven", getting paid £2 to vandalise expensive cars parked near St Alfege Church, Greenwich. The sequence showed children walking alongside a line of parked cars, casually scraping the cars' paintwork with keys and coins.

Of the kiss scene between Head and Finch, Schlesinger said he wanted to direct it "purely natural. Both Peter and Murray were totally involved in their parts and they were certainly less shocked by the kiss than some of the technicians."

"We were eager to make a tender film," said Schlesinger.

During filming Head was in a motorbike accident and the child actors came down with measles.

Music
The film makes extensive use of source music including a leitmotif of the trio Soave sia il vento from Mozart's opera Così fan tutte.

Reception
Schlesinger says that when he showed the film to United Artists executives in New York, "they were all appalled except David Picker. They were prepared to let it quietly die."

The film had its premiere at the Leicester Square Theatre in London on 1 July 1971.

Critical
The film holds an 86% rating on Rotten Tomatoes from 29 reviews.

Peter Rainer of Bloomberg News wrote, "It's Finch's finest moment as an actor (and literally a far cry from his most famous role as the "mad prophet of the airwaves" in Network). As for Jackson, she was never better, more variegated."

This film appeared on both Roger Ebert and Gene Siskel's Top 10 list of 1971, listed as No. 5 and No. 6 respectively. Roger Ebert commented, "The official East Coast line on John Schlesinger's Sunday Bloody Sunday was that it is civilized. That judgment was enlisted to carry the critical defense of the movie; and, indeed, how can the decent critic be against a civilized movie about civilized people? My notion, all the same, is that Sunday Bloody Sunday is about people who suffer from psychic amputation, not civility, and that this film is not an affirmation but a tragedy... I think Sunday Bloody Sunday is a masterpiece, but I don't think it's about what everybody else seems to think it's about. This is not a movie about the loss of love, but about its absence."

Box office
The film performed strongly at the box office in urban centres but was not popular outside these and ultimately lost money. It grossed £20,149 in its first 13 days of release at the Leicester Square Theatre.

Accolades

Home media 
Sunday Bloody Sunday was released in blu-ray by the Criterion Collection in the U.S. and by the BFI in the U.K..

See also
 BFI Top 100 British films

Notes

References
Citations

Works cited

External links
 
 
 
 
 "Making Sunday Bloody Sunday" – an essay by Penelope Gilliatt at The Criterion Collection

1971 films
1971 drama films
1971 LGBT-related films
1970s English-language films
Best Film BAFTA Award winners
Bisexuality-related films
British drama films
British LGBT-related films
Films directed by John Schlesinger
Films set in England
Films set in London
Films shot in England
Films whose director won the Best Direction BAFTA Award
Gay-related films
LGBT-related drama films
Male bisexuality in film
1970s British films